J. K. Institute of Applied Physics and Technology is one of the most prestigious colleges of India. It is also known as the Department of Electronics and Communication. It is located in the Muir College Campus (Science Faculty) of University of Allahabad

This institute is older than any of the IITs. Its foundation stone was laid by Jawaharlal Nehru on April 14, 1949 and was formally inaugurated by him on April 4, 1956. It was named after J.K as the J. K. Trust contributed for the construction of the complete building structure. The department is a pioneer in teaching and research of electronics, communication and computer science in the country today.

The department conducts courses in the fields of Electronics & Communication and Computer Science leading up to the degrees of the Bachelor of Technology, Master of Technology and Master of Science. These courses have been designed to meet the current challenging demands of the nation.

The Computer Science discipline was started in the year 1986 through the DRDO project on the ‘Man Power development in the area of computer Science’. The department offers B.Sc (CS), M.Sc. (Computer Science), B.Tech. (Electronics and Communication Engineering), B.Tech. (Computer Science and Engineering ), M.Tech. (Electronic and Communication Engineering) M.Tech. (Computer Science and Engineering) and Ph.D. program in Electronics and Computer Science.

In a span of nearly 60 years, the alumni of the departments have made significant mark in their fields both in India and overseas.  Some of them are entrepreneurs. Alumni include; Shivpal Singh - Scientist ‘F’ RCI, Alok Chaturvedi - Indian Railways, Dr. Shamim Ahmad - Ex-VC Jamia Hamdard, Ranjan Ghosh - Alcatel-Lucent.

History

Its foundation stone was laid by Jawaharlal Nehru, the first prime minister of India, on 14 April 1949 and it was formally inaugurated by him on 4 April 1956. J. K. Charitable Trust contributed for the construction of the complete building structure of the institute, hence the department's name.

J. K. stands for "Juggilal Kamlapat", so the full name is "Juggilal Kamlapat Institute of Applied Physics and Technology".

The department has a long history of collaboration with some of the country's top research institutes such as DRDO.  The undergraduate course in Computer Science was started in the year 1982 and the post graduate course in Computer Science was started in the year 1986. The defense Research and Development organization (DRDO) had selected the institute as a center of Manpower development in the area of Computer Science through which the students were inducted as Scientist B in their organizations up to 1992. After 1992, M.Sc. Computer Science program has been taken over as UGC program.

Location and accessibility
J. K. Institute is centrally located in the city, inside the Science faculty campus of University of Allahabad (25.4591° N, 81.85202° E). It is about 4 km from Allahabad Junction. J. K. institute is situated near the historic department of mathematics university of Allahabad which was established before establishment of the university in 1887.

Academic courses
The department conducts courses in the fields of Electronics & Communication and Computer Science leading up to the degrees of bachelor of technology, master of technology and master of science. These courses have been designed to meet the current challenging demands of the nation. The Department offers B.Tech. (Electronics & Communication Engineering), B.Tech. (Computer Science & Engineering), M.Tech. (Electronic & Communication Engineering), M.Tech. (Computer Science & Engineering), B.Sc (Computer Science), M.Sc (Computer Science), MCA and D.Phil programs in the field of Computer Science, Electronics and Communication.

Admission
The department admits Under-Graduate students through Joint Entrance Examination Main  conducted by National Testing Agency and Central Seat Allocation Board. Post-graduate (M.Tech) admission is through GATE.

Avirbhav 
Avirbhav: Fiesta for Renaissance, the annual cultural and technical fest of the department, is welcomed by each student with immense eagerness. It is a carnival for the incredible talent dwelling in the college. The 5- day fest is inaugurated with a cause-oriented marathon followed by various sports, academic, formal and informal events that finally end in a spectacular cultural eve. The fest is autonomously organized by the students bringing in a great deal of sponsorship from several organizations. It lasts for some days and includes technology, programming, debate, dance, music, sports and other activities.

References 

University of Allahabad
Engineering colleges in Allahabad
1949 establishments in India
Educational institutions established in 1949